Labour Friends of Japan (LFJ) is an organisation of members of the UK Labour Party who are of Japanese origin or interested in Japan. It is an independent organization not affiliated with the Labour Party.

It was founded in 2015 and enjoys support at parliamentary, devolved and local authority level. It is listed as an associated organisation of Chinese for Labour (which is affiliated to Labour).

References

Organisations associated with the Labour Party (UK)
Japan–United Kingdom relations